Valter Corneliu Chifu (born September 2, 1952) is a Romanian former volleyball player who competed in the 1980 Summer Olympics.

In 1980 he was part of the Romanian team which won the bronze medal in the Olympic tournament. He played five matches.

External links 
 
 

1953 births
Living people
Romanian men's volleyball players
Olympic volleyball players of Romania
Volleyball players at the 1980 Summer Olympics
Olympic bronze medalists for Romania
Olympic medalists in volleyball
Medalists at the 1980 Summer Olympics